Bryan Lim Tze Kang (born 1 February 1996 in Seremban) is a Malaysian professional squash player. As of May 2021, he was ranked number 175 in the world.

References

1996 births
Living people
Malaysian male squash players
21st-century Malaysian people